The China Open is a professional snooker tournament. It is one of a number of ranking tournaments and began in 1997. The reigning champion is Neil Robertson.

History

The first international snooker tournament in China was the China International in September 1997, a non-ranking tournament for the top 16 players and local players. The following season the tournament became ranking and was held in March. Then the name of the event was changed to China Open and was held in December, so there were two events in 1999. After the 2002 tournament the event was abandoned.

The event was revived for the 2004/05 season. Local wild-card players were invited to play against the qualifiers. The three Chinese players on the tour were invited to play as wild-cards, rather than qualify the usual way. Ding Junhui was one of them, and he won the tournament, but as he entered as a wild-card, he received no prize money nor ranking points.

, the tournament took place at the Olympic Sports Center Gymnasium, Chaoyang District, Beijing in early April, and it is usually the last ranking event before the World Championship.

Winners

Records

Statistics 
Highest break: 147
 James Wattana (1997)
 Stephen Maguire (2008)
 Neil Robertson (2010)
 Judd Trump (2017)
 Stuart Bingham (2018)
 Ronnie O'Sullivan (2018)
 Stuart Bingham (2019)

Finalists

Champions by country

References

 
Recurring sporting events established in 1997
1997 establishments in China
Snooker ranking tournaments
Snooker competitions in China
Sports competitions in Beijing
Sport in Shenzhen
Sports competitions in Shanghai
Sports competitions in Guangdong